The sinking of the RMS Titanic on 15 April 1912 resulted in an inquiry by the British Wreck Commissioner on behalf of the British Board of Trade. The inquiry was overseen by High Court judge Lord Mersey, and was held in London from 2 May to 3 July 1912. The hearings took place mainly at the London Scottish Drill Hall, at 59 Buckingham Gate, London SW1.

There were a total of 42 days of official investigation. Lord Mersey and the various counsels, assessors and experts in marine law and shipping architecture, questioned White Star Line officials, government officials, surviving passengers and crew, and those who had aided the rescue efforts. Organisations represented by legal counsels included shipping unions and government organisations. Nearly 100 witnesses testified, answering more than 25,000 questions. The questioning resulted in a report that contained a detailed description of the ship, an account of the ship's journey, a description of the damage caused by the iceberg, and an account of the evacuation and rescue.

The final report was published on 30 July 1912. Its recommendations, along with those of the earlier United States Senate inquiry that had taken place in the month after the sinking, led to changes in safety practices following the disaster.

Background

The sinking was caused by a collision with an iceberg in the North Atlantic some 700 nautical miles east of Halifax, Nova Scotia. Over 1500 passengers and crew died, with some 710 survivors in Titanics lifeboats rescued by  a few hours later. There was initially some confusion in both the United States and the UK over the extent of the disaster, with some newspapers at first reporting that the ship and the passengers and crew were safe. By the time Carpathia reached New York, it had become clear that Titanic, reputed to be unsinkable, had sunk and many had died. Official inquiries were set up in both countries to investigate the circumstances of the disaster.

Formation

When news of the disaster reached the UK government the responsibility for initiating an inquiry lay with the Board of Trade, the organisation responsible for British maritime regulations and whose inspectors had certified Titanic as seaworthy before her maiden voyage. On 22 April 1912, Sydney Buxton, President of the Board of Trade, asked Lord Loreburn, the Lord Chancellor, to set up a commission of inquiry. The Lord Chancellor appointed Lord Mersey as the inquiry's President.

The resultant hearings took place from 2 May to 3 July 1912, mainly at the London Scottish Drill Hall, on Buckingham Gate. The location was chosen for its large size, as sizeable audiences were expected, but turned out to have terrible acoustics that made it hard to hear what was going on. The last two days were held at Caxton Hall, Westminster due to the Scottish Drill Hall being booked for an examination. To assist the inquiry, Titanics builders Harland and Wolff provided a  half-model of the ship showing its starboard side, next to which was mounted a large map showing the North Atlantic shipping lanes and locations of sea ice.

The Attorney General for England and Wales, Sir Rufus Isaacs, gave the commission a list of 26 questions concerning issues such as Titanics construction, how she had been navigated and the ice warnings received prior to the collision with the iceberg.

Legal personnel
Those carrying out the questioning and representation included legal counsels, and assessors and experts in marine law and shipping architecture. The five assessors consisted of Rear Admiral the Honourable Somerset Gough-Calthorpe; Captain A. W. Clarke of Trinity House; Commander Fitzroy Lyon of the Royal Naval Reserve; Professor John Harvard Biles, an expert on naval architecture at the University of Glasgow; and Edward Chaston, an Admiralty senior engineer assessor.

Also involved were the Attorney General, Sir Rufus Isaacs (representing the Board of Trade), Robert Finlay (representing the White Star Line), Thomas Scanlan, and Clement Edwards. Organisations represented included shipping unions and government organisations. The maritime law firm Hill Dickinson represented the White Star Line. Other counsel (several of whom were also Members of Parliament) included Hamar Greenwood and Henry Duke, the solicitor-general John Simon (also representing the Board of Trade), the prime minister's son Raymond Asquith, Sidney Rowlatt, and Edward Maurice Hill.

Organisations with counsel representing or watching on their behalf included the Board of Trade, the White Star Line, the National Sailors' and Firemen's Union of Great Britain and Ireland (see National Union of Seamen), the Chamber of Shipping of the United Kingdom, the British Seafarers' Union, the Imperial Merchant Service Guild, the Marine Engineers' Association, the National Union of Stewards (see National Union of Ship's Stewards), and the builders of the ship, Harland and Wolff. Organisations with representatives watching the proceedings were Allan Line Royal Mail Steamers, Canadian Pacific Railway, and Leyland Line.

Testimony

During 36 days of official investigations (spread over two months), testimony was recorded from nearly 100 witnesses in the form of answers to set questions that the process was designed to answer. These questions, combined with sometimes extensive cross-examination, resulted in over 25,000 questions being recorded in the official court records. With a cost of nearly £20,000 (£ at today's prices), it was the longest and most detailed court of inquiry in British history up to that time. Those testifying included surviving passengers and crew members, as well as captains and crew members of other ships in the vicinity, expert witnesses, government officials, and White Star Line officials and ship designers.

Surviving crew members who testified included the most senior surviving officer Charles Lightoller (Second Officer on Titanic), the lookout who sounded the alarm Frederick Fleet, the surviving wireless operator Harold Bride, and the ship's baker Charles Joughin. Those from other ships who gave evidence at the hearings included Harold Cottam (wireless operator on Carpathia), Stanley Lord (Captain of Californian), Arthur Rostron (Captain of Carpathia), and J. B. Ranson (Captain of ). Expert witnesses included Guglielmo Marconi (Chairman of the Marconi Company), and explorer Sir Ernest Shackleton. Others called to give testimony included Harold Arthur Sanderson, UK Vice President of International Mercantile Marine Co., the shipping consortium headed by J. P. Morgan that controlled White Star Line. White Star Line officials that testified included J. Bruce Ismay (Chairman and Managing Director) and Charles Alfred Bartlett (Marine Superintendent). From Harland and Wolff, evidence was given by Alexander Carlisle (Naval Architect). Carlisle was the brother-in-law of the shipyard's chairman Lord Pirrie, and together with Pirrie was initially responsible for the design of the Olympic-class liners (including Titanic). Carlisle had retired in 1910, and like Pirrie had not travelled on the maiden voyage of Titanic. The lead designer on board had been Thomas Andrews, Pirrie's nephew, who went down with the ship. The only passengers to testify, other than Ismay, were Sir Cosmo Duff-Gordon and his wife Lucy, Lady Duff-Gordon.

The questioning of the Californians crew and the Duff Gordons were seen as highlights of the inquiry. The failure of Californian to go to the rescue of the sinking Titanic, which had been disclosed by the American inquiry, was already controversial and became even more so with the testimony of Captain Lord and his officers. Lord's claims and explanations were contradicted by his officers and he was portrayed by them as an intimidating and somewhat tyrannical figure. Although Lord appeared only as a witness and was not accused of wrongdoing, as one historian of the Titanic disaster has put it, "the image created in the mind of the public ever since has been of the Californian's officers standing idly on the bridge, so thoroughly intimidated by their captain that they would rather watch another ship sink than run the risk of facing his wrath." The testimony of the Duff Gordons, who had been accused of misconduct for their actions in leaving Titanic aboard a lifeboat with 40 seats but only 12 passengers, attracted the largest crowds of the inquiry. Many notable society figures attended, including Margot Asquith, the wife of Prime Minister H. H. Asquith; the Russian Ambassador to London, Count Aleksandr Beckendorf; several Members of Parliament, and various aristocrats.

Testimony was given relating to the fire which had begun in Titanics coal stores approximately 10 days prior to the ship's departure, and continued to burn for several days into its maiden voyage out of Southampton. Little note was taken of it. It has been theorised by a modern-day historian (2016) that the fire damaged the structural integrity of two bulkheads and the hull; this combined with the speed of the vessel have been given as contributing reasons for the disaster.

Report and conclusions
The final report was published on 30 July 1912. The lines of questioning at the inquiry had resulted in a detailed description of the ship, an account of the ship's journey, a description of the damage caused by the iceberg, an account of the evacuation and rescue. There was also a special section devoted to the circumstances of Californian.

The report found that Titanics sinking was solely the result of colliding with the iceberg, not due to any inherent flaws with the ship, and that the collision had been brought about by a dangerously fast speed in icy waters:

The Court, having carefully inquired into the circumstances of the above mentioned shipping casualty, finds, for the reasons appearing in the annex hereto, that the loss of the said ship was due to collision with an iceberg, brought about by the excessive speed at which the ship was being navigated.

It also found that the lookout being kept was inadequate given the navigational hazards Titanic faced, and that the ship's officers had been complacent. There were too few lifeboats available and they had not been properly filled or manned with trained seamen, though they had been lowered correctly. The inquiry concluded that Californian "could have pushed through the ice to the open water without any serious risk and so have come to the assistance of the Titanic. Had she done so she might have saved many if not all of the lives that were lost." The Board of Trade's representative suggested to Lord Mersey that a formal inquiry should be held into Captain Lord's "competency to continue as Master of a British ship" but no action was taken against him due to legal technicalities. The Board of Trade was criticised for its inadequate regulations, notably the failure to ensure that enough lifeboats were provided and that crews were given proper training in their use. The Duff Gordons were cleared of wrongdoing but it was made clear that they should have acted more tactfully.

In contrast to the American inquiry, the Mersey report did not condemn the failures of the Board of Trade, the White Star Line or Titanics captain, Edward Smith. The report found that although Smith was at fault for not changing course or slowing down, he had not been negligent because he had followed long-standing practice which had not previously been shown to be unsafe (the inquiry noted that British ships alone had carried 3.5 million passengers over the previous decade with the loss of just 10 lives). It concluded that Smith had merely done "only that which other skilled men would have done in the same position." However, the practice itself was faulty and "it is to be hoped that the last has been heard of this practice. What was a mistake in the case of the Titanic would without doubt be negligence in any similar case in the future."

The report's recommendations, along with those of the earlier United States Senate inquiry that had taken place in the month after the sinking, led to changes in safety practices following the disaster.

Reactions
The report was well received by the British press. The Daily Telegraph commented that although "technically speaking, the report is not the last word, but in practice it would probably be treated as if it were." The Daily Mail opined that it was "difficult to suppose that any court which had to inquire into the responsibility of the owners of the ship would disregard the expression of opinion of Lord Mersey and those who sat with him ... The report having, in effect, acquitted them of all blame, it is not likely that any attempt will be made hereafter to establish the contrary."

Others were more critical. In his memoirs, Charles Lightoller pointed out the inquiry's conflict of interest: "A washing of dirty linen would help no one. The Board of Trade had passed that ship as in all respects fit for the sea ... Now the Board of Trade was holding an inquiry into the loss of that ship – hence the whitewash brush." Titanic historian Donald Lynch notes the consequences: "Apart from protecting itself, the [Board of Trade] had no interest in seeing the White Star Line found negligent. Any damage to White Star's reputation or balance sheet would be bad for British shipping – and there was considerable potential for both. Negligence on the part of the shipping company might pave the way for millions of dollars in damage claims and lawsuits that would tie up the courts for years, possibly break the White Star Line, and result in the loss of much of Britain's lucrative shipping traffic to the Germans and the French."

Stephanie Barczewski notes the contrast between the approaches taken by the American and British inquiries. The British inquiry was much more technical, "the more learned and erudite of the two", while the American inquiry's report was a reflection of a comparatively poorly managed inquiry that had frequently allowed itself to get sidetracked. However, the American report took a much more robust stance on the failures that had led to the disaster. As Barczewski puts it, it "bristles with criticisms of established seafaring traditions and of the conduct of the Titanics builders, owners, officers and crew", and conveys "righteous indignation" and a "passion to right the wrongs" done to the victims of the disaster and to prevent any recurrence. The authors of the two reports took markedly different interpretations of how the disaster had come about. The American report castigated the arrogance and complacency that had led to the disaster and held Captain Smith, the shipping industry and the Board of Trade culpable for their failures. The British report emphasized that "the importance of this Enquiry has to do with the future. No Enquiry can repair the past."

See also
United States Senate inquiry into the sinking of the Titanic

Notes

Bibliography

External links
SOS Titanic, details of a TV dramatisation of the inquiry (BBC)

Further reading
Complete transcripts of the inquiry and report are available at British Wreck Commissioner's Inquiry (Titanic Inquiry Project)
Mersey, Lord (1999) [1912]. The Loss of the Titanic, 1912. The Stationery Office. 
Chapter 3 ('Exercise Your Own Common Sense') of The Titanic Story: Hard Choices, Dangerous Decisions (Stephen Cox, 1999) 
Notes on Life and Letters by Joseph Conrad includes an essay ("Certain Aspects of the Admirable Inquiry into the Loss of the Titanic") on the inquiries (Wikisource)

Public inquiries in the United Kingdom
RMS Titanic
1912 in London

fr:Commissions d'enquête sur le naufrage du Titanic